Edward M. Rowe (March 17, 1902 – December 16, 1971) was an American politician who served in the Massachusetts Senate and was a two-time candidate for Governor of Massachusetts.

Early life
Rowe was born on March 17, 1902, in Indianapolis, Indiana. He graduated from Harvard College in 1927 and Harvard Law School in 1931. Rowe remained in Cambridge, Massachusetts after graduating from Harvard.

Political career
In 1942, Rowe was elected to represent the 2nd Middlesex District in the Massachusetts Senate. In 1948 he ran for Governor of Massachusetts, accusing incumbent Republican Governor Robert F. Bradford of being in an "unwholesome political alliance" with Boston Mayor James Michael Curley. Bradford defeated Rowe by a 5 to 1 margin to win the Republican nomination. On November 27, 1948, was critically injured in a hit and run accident in Back Bay. He eventually recovered. In 1950, Rowe again ran for Governor. He finished last in the six candidate primary with 2% of the vote.

Death
Rowe died on December 16, 1971, at his home in Cambridge.

See also
 Massachusetts legislature: 1943–1944, 1945–1946, 1947–1948

References

1902 births
1971 deaths
20th-century American politicians
Harvard Law School alumni
Republican Party Massachusetts state senators
Politicians from Cambridge, Massachusetts
Harvard College alumni